Alexander  Mackenzie (9 April 1923 – 18 September 2002) was a British abstract artist, an active member of the Penwith Art Society and Newlyn Art Gallery and educator.  Mackenzie was born on 9 April 1923 in Liverpool. He was married to Coralie Crockett and the couple had three daughters, Pat, Althea and Rachel.

He had a brother named Paul Mackenzie who had three daughters Alison, Alexandra and Elli Mackenzie.

Career

At the beginning of the war his school as evacuated to Newburgh Priory, which was part of his introduction to art – he later described it as "a marvellous place, filled with tapestries and paintings".

As soon as he was old enough, he enlisted in the army, serving for 5 years in the armoured Inns of Court Regiment and fighting in the European theatre of war, including commanding an armoured car up the beaches on D-Day.  In 1945 he was de-mobed and went to study at Liverpool College of Art.

In 1950, immediately after graduating from Liverpool, he moved to Cornwall, where he soon established close relationships with many artists, including Ben Nicholson and Barbara Hepworth  He was based there for the rest of his life.

For several years he taught art at Leskudjack school in Penzance before, in 1964, being invited to become a senior lecturer at Plymouth College of Art, where he stayed for 20 years, ending up as head of fine art.

In 1959, he had his first one-person exhibition, at the Waddington Galleries in London.  In 1960, he took part in the 21st Watercolour Biennale in New York and, in 1962, he was in the Premio Marzotto exhibition in Rome. He died in Penzance on 18 September 2002.

His auction record is £27,500, set for Gwithian at Christie's, London, on 27 May 2010.

Collections

His Drawing, June 1963 is in the Tate collection.  Two works are in the Arts Council collection.

Mackenzie's art work can be seen at Bishop Suter Gallery, Nelson, New Zealand, Brasenose College, University of Oxford, Bradford City Art Gallery, the Calouste Gulbenkian Foundation collection, the Contemporary Art Society collection, Art Gallery of New South Wales, Sydney, Australia, the Nuffield Foundation collection, Plymouth City Art Gallery, Salford Museum & Art Gallery and York Art Gallery.

Exhibitions

Mackenzie exhibited widely throughout his life and posthumously, and was included in the following significant exhibitions:

Solo exhibitions

 1959, 1961, 1963: Waddington Galleries, London
 1960, 1962: Durlachers Gallery, New York
 1965: Paintings by Alexander Mackenzie, Plymouth City Art Gallery
 1965, 1968, 1970: Maltzahn Gallery, London
 1977: Retrospective Exhibition Paintings and Drawing by Alexander Mackenzie, the Truro Gallery
 1980: Newlyn Orion Gallery, Newlyn
 1982: Festival Gallery, Bath
 1999: Austin/Desmond Fine Art, London
 2007: Austin/Desmond Fine Art

Selected group exhibitions

 1952: Penwith Society of Arts, St Ives (and then annually)
 1955: Daily Express Young Artists Exhibition, London
 1959: Whitechapel Art Gallery Graven Image
 1959: Arte Grafica Britanico, Bogotá, Colombia
 1960: Bradford City Art Gallery, Contemporary British Art
 1960: Brooklyn Museum, 21st International Water Colour Biennal, New York,
 1961: Arts Council Exhibition, New Painting 58-61
 1962–63: Premio Marzotto E L’Arte, European Community Contemporary Painting Exhibition, Rome, Milan and London
 1970: Plymouth City Art Gallery, Alexander Mackenzie and Bryan Wynter
 1975: Plymouth City Art Gallery, Painting & Sculpture 1975
 1977: New Art Centre, Cornwall 1944–55
 1977: Kunst Aus Cornwall, Cuxhaven, Germany
 1984: Newlyn/Orion, Second Nature, toured to the Institute of Contemporary Arts, London
 1985: Tate Gallery, St Ives 1939–64
 1985: Plymouth City Art Gallery, Landscape: Fact and Feeling
 1986: Pallant House Gallery, Cornwall in the 80s
 1987: Newlyn Art Gallery, Looking West, touring to the Royal College of Art, London
 1992: Royal West of England Academy, Artists in Cornwall

Bibliography

 Herbert Read & Roland Penrose: Premio Marzotto Award Catalogue, 1963
 A. Cumming: Profile of Alexander Mackenzie, Arts Review, Vol XX No.20
 Sir Herbert Read: Contemporary British Art, Penguin Publications, 1964
 Dictionary of Twentieth Century Art, Phaidon Press, 1973
 Tate Gallery, Catalogue of Acquisitions 1976-8
 Arts Council Collection, 1979
 Richard Mabey: Second Nature, Jonathon Cape, 1984
 Tate Gallery, St Ives 1939–64, Tate Gallery Publications, 1985
 Alan Windsor: Handbook of Modern British Painting 1900–1980, Scolar Press, 1992
 Peter Davies: St Ives Revisited, Old Bakehouse Publications, 1994
 Melissa Hardie: 100 Years in Newlyn/Diary of a Gallery, Pattten Press, 1995
 David Archer: Alexander Mackenzie, Austin/Desmond Fine Art, 1999
 Michael Bird:  Alexander Mackenzie: In character, Austin/Desmond, 2007

References

External links

 Alexander Mackenzie's obituary in the Guardian
 Exhibition catalogue from Austin/Desmond exhibition in 2009
 Alexander Mackenzie in the Cornwall Artists' Index

1923 births
2002 deaths
20th-century English painters
English male painters
21st-century English painters
Modern painters
Artists from Liverpool
St Ives artists
20th-century English male artists
21st-century English male artists